Tolmachyovo is a rural locality in Lebyazhensky Selsoviet Rural Settlement, Kursky District, Kursk Oblast, Russia. Population:

Geography 
The village is located on the Seym River (a left tributary of the Desna), 92 km from the Russia–Ukraine border, at the еаstern border of Kursk, 8 km from the selsoviet center – Cheryomushki.

 Streets
There are the following streets in the locality: Lesnaya, Lugovaya, Sosnovaya and Yevgeniya Nosova (193 houses).

 Climate
Tolmachyovo has a warm-summer humid continental climate (Dfb in the Köppen climate classification).

Transport 
Tolmachyovo is located on the road of regional importance  (Kursk – Zorino – Tolmachyovo), 2.5 km from the railway junction 470 km (railway line Lgov I — Kursk).

The rural locality is situated 7 km from Kursk Vostochny Airport, 116 km from Belgorod International Airport and 206 km from Voronezh Peter the Great Airport.

References

Notes

Sources

Rural localities in Kursky District, Kursk Oblast